Kampung Admiralty is Singapore's first integrated retirement community project by Housing and Development Board. It was designed by WOHA.

Geography
Kampung Admiralty is an 11-storey complex of two residential blocks of about 100 studio apartments. Therefore, Kampung Admiralty is officially opened on 12 May 2018.

Facilities
Community plaza - ground floor
Pharmacy - ground floor
900-seater hawker centre - Level 2
Admiralty Medical Centre - Level 3 and Level 4. It provides residents with specialist care and day surgery, and is run by Khoo Teck Puat Hospital
Community garden - Level 9

Accolades
2016 World Architecture Festival: Best Commercial Mixed-Use Future Project award
2018 International Chapter Architecture Awards: Commendation for commercial architecture 
2018 World Architecture Festival: Building of the Year

References

Retirement communities
WOHA